Unspoken is the sixth studio album by jazz saxophonist Chris Potter released by Concord Jazz in 1997. It features Potter in a quartet with guitarist John Scofield, bassist Dave Holland and drummer Jack DeJohnette.

Reception

The Allmusic review by Leo Stanley awarded the album 4 stars stating "Chris Potter recorded his most adventurous record to date with Unspoken. Although his powerhouse rhythm section sometimes overwhelms him, Potter flexes more creative muscle throughout Unspoken, resulting in an engaging, frequently provocative listen".

All About Jazz correspondent Robert Spencer observed "Unspoken is a solid album from start to finish. The sidemen are top-notch throughout, and the leader doesn't disappoint. I'll be interested to check out Chris Potter's future work".

In JazzTimes, Bill Milkowski wrote "On his latest for Concord, Unspoken, Potter leaps to another level. Different influences are beginning to creep into both his playing and writing on this superb outing. There's a looseness and a spirit of adventure that one did not necessarily encounter in his earlier efforts".

Track listing
All compositions by Chris Potter
 "Wistful" – 7:45
 "Seven Eleven" – 9:08
 "Hieroglyph" – 6:00
 "Amsterdam Blues" – 7:50
 "Et Tu, Bruté?" – 7:12
 "Unspoken" – 5:41
 "No Cigar" – 5:18
 "Time Zone" – 8:55
 "New Vision" – 7:11

Personnel
Chris Potter – tenor saxophone, soprano saxophone
John Scofield − guitar
Dave Holland − bass
Jack DeJohnette – drums

References

Chris Potter (jazz saxophonist) albums
1997 albums
Concord Records albums